Skywalk is an album by organist Jimmy McGriff recorded in 1984 and released on the Milestone label.

Reception 

Allmusic's Scott Yanow said: "Heard with a nonet on three numbers, a quintet on two songs, and an 11-piece outfit during his "Skywalk," McGriff is in his usual fine form  ... Outside of altoist Bill Easley and guitarist Jimmy Ponder, the sidemen are pretty obscure, although quite capable in this setting".

Track listing
All compositions by Jimmy McGriff except where noted
 "Skywalk" – 8:43
 "Easy Time" (Louie Bellson, Tommy Newsom) – 7:53
 "Motoring Along" – 3:07
 "Let's Stay Together" (Al Green, Willie Mitchell, Al Jackson Jr.) – 7:56
 "Barb' Wine" (Wayne Boyd) – 7:25
 "Jersey Bounce" (Tiny Bradshaw, Eddie Johnson, Bobby Plater, Robert B. Wright) – 5:32

Personnel
Jimmy McGriff – organ
Glenn Kaye, Michael Ridley – trumpet (tracks 1, 2 & 6)
Dominick Carelli – trombone (tracks 1, 2 & 6)
Bill Easley – alto saxophone, tenor saxophone 
Arnold Sterling – alto saxophone (tracks 1 & 3-5)
Coy Shockley –  tenor saxophone 
James Brundige – baritone saxophone (tracks 1, 2 & 6)
Jimmy Ponder (tracks 1, 2 & 6), Wayne Boyd (tracks 1 & 3-5) – guitar 
Don Williams − drums

References

Milestone Records albums
Jimmy McGriff albums
1984 albums
Albums produced by Bob Porter (record producer)